The Oltenia Day is a public holiday of Romania celebrated every 21 March that commemorates the entry in Bucharest on 21 March 1821 of the Romanian revolutionary Tudor Vladimirescu, who started the Wallachian uprising of 1821 in Oltenia, where he was born. The holiday was promulgated on 13 April 2017 by Law No. 65/2017 by the President of Romania Klaus Iohannis and published in the Monitorul Oficial on the same day. Previously, the project to establish the holiday had been approved by the Senate of Romania on 1 November 2016 and by the Chamber of Deputies of Romania on 21 March 2017. The ones that first proposed the holiday were a group of 27 deputies and senators belonging to different Romanian political parties.

According to the law that promulgated the holiday, on the Oltenia Day, the central and local authorities and also public cultural institutions are allowed to organize artistic, cultural and scientific events. Furthermore, the Romanian Television Society and the Romanian Radio Broadcasting Company may also include programs related to the Oltenia Day.

The day, which is a symbol of pride among the locals, is celebrated in various parts of Oltenia such as Craiova or Târgu Jiu.

See also
 Public holidays in Romania
 Bukovina Day
 Dobruja Day
 Great Union Day

References

Oltenia
Annual events in Romania
Spring (season) events in Romania
Observances in Romania
March observances
Public holidays in Romania
2017 establishments in Romania